Félix Piñero (born 23 December 1945) is a Venezuelan fencer. He competed in the individual and team foil and individual épée events at the 1968 Summer Olympics.

References

External links
 

1945 births
Living people
Venezuelan male épée fencers
Olympic fencers of Venezuela
Fencers at the 1968 Summer Olympics
People from Caracas
Venezuelan male foil fencers
Pan American Games medalists in fencing
20th-century Venezuelan people
Medalists at the 1967 Pan American Games
Pan American Games bronze medalists for Venezuela
Fencers at the 1967 Pan American Games